"Under Your Spell Again"  is a song co-written and recorded by American country music artist Buck Owens. The song peaked at number 4 on the U.S. Billboard Hot Country Singles chart.

Chart performance

Buck Owens

Ray Price

Johnny Rivers

Waylon Jennings and Jessi Colter

Barbara Fairchild

Shelby Lynne

Cover versions
Ray Price recorded and released his version also in 1959, the same year Buck Owens did.

Jeanne Black and her sister Janie Black released a version of the song as the B-side to her 1960 hit single "He'll Have to Stay".

References
 

1959 songs
1959 singles
1971 singles
1976 singles
1989 singles
Songs written by Buck Owens
Song recordings produced by Ken Nelson (American record producer)
Buck Owens songs
Ray Price (musician) songs
Waylon Jennings songs
Jessi Colter songs
Barbara Fairchild songs
Shelby Lynne songs